Paul (de) Choudens, also known under the pseudonym Paul Bérel (5 June 1850 – 7 October 1925), was a French musician, music publisher, poet and librettist.

Biography
Choudens was born in Paris. In 1888, with his brother Antony, he took over the publishing house established by his father Antoine de Choudens in 1845 and made a fortune in publishing in particular, the music scores of Faust by Gounod and Carmen by Bizet. He was a staunch supporter of Alfred Bruneau, Paul Vidal and André Messager.

As a librettist, he translated and adapted Der Schauspieldirektor by Mozart in collaboration with Arthur Bernède with whom he would write five libretti for the composer Félix Fourdrain.

Libretti
 Henri Hirschmann: Lovelace (in collaboration with Jules Barbier)
 Pietro Mascagni: Amica
 Isidore de Lara: Sanga
 Ruggero Leoncavallo: Maïa
 Camille Erlanger: L'Aube rouge
 Albert Dupuis: La Passion
 Xavier Leroux: La Plus forte
 Henry Février: Oletta, la fille du Corse

Bibliography
Anik Devriès & François Lesure: Dictionnaire des éditeurs de musique français, vol. 2 (Geneva: Minkoff, 1988), p. 107–109.
Agnès Chauvin: "L'Hôtel Choudens",  in: Livraisons d'histoire de l'architecture, no. 18, 2nd semester 2009.

1850 births
1925 deaths
Chevaliers of the Légion d'honneur
French music publishers (people)
French opera librettists
Writers from Paris
19th-century French writers
19th-century publishers (people)
19th-century French male writers
20th-century French writers
20th-century publishers (people)
20th-century French male writers